The 2019–20 Arkansas Razorbacks women's basketball team represented the University of Arkansas during the 2019–20 NCAA Division I women's basketball season. The Razorbacks, led by third-year head coach Mike Neighbors, played their home games at Bud Walton Arena and competed as members of the Southeastern Conference (SEC).

Preseason

SEC media poll
The SEC media poll was released on October 15, 2019.

Incoming Transfers

2020 recruiting class

Roster

Rankings

^Coaches' Poll did not release a second poll at the same time as the AP.

Schedule

|-
!colspan=9 style=| Exhibition

|-
!colspan=9 style=| Non-conference regular season

|-
!colspan=9 style=| SEC regular season

|-
!colspan=9 style=| SEC Tournament

See also
2019–20 Arkansas Razorbacks men's basketball team

References

Arkansas Razorbacks women's basketball seasons
Arkansas
Arkansas Razorbacks
Arkansas Razorbacks